Dulaylat al Hama'idah  is a town in the Madaba Governorate of northwestern Jordan.

References

Populated places in Madaba Governorate